Selma Ibn Abdullahi was a king of Kanem. His reign was turbulent as the kingdom was under attack from the Sao groups of Southern lake Chad.

Rulers of the Kanem Empire